Patia railway station is a small railway station in Bhubaneswar, Odisha. Its code is PTAB. The station consists of two platforms. The platforms are not well sheltered. It lacks many facilities including water and sanitation.

References

Khurda Road railway division
Buildings and structures in Bhubaneswar
Railway stations in Bhubaneswar